Seth Bane Miller (born March 20, 1948) is a former American football player. He played three years of professional football as a safety in the Canadian Football League (CFL) and World Football League (WFL).

Miller was born in Carthage, Arkansas in 1948 and attended Auburn High School in Rockford, Illinois. He played college football at Arizona State from 1966 to 1969. 

He began playing professional football in the Canadian Football League in 1971 as a defensive back for the Hamilton Tiger-Cats. He appeared in three CFL games during the 1971 season.

In 1974, he joined the World Football League, playing for the Memphis Southmen during the 1974 and 1975 seasons. He had 14 interceptions while playing in the WFL.

References

1948 births
Living people
Hamilton Tiger-Cats players
Memphis Southmen players
Players of American football from Arkansas
Arizona State Sun Devils football players
American football defensive backs
Canadian football defensive backs